Andrew Jackson Kuykendall (March 3, 1815 – May 11, 1891) was a U.S. Representative from Illinois.

Biography
Born in Gallatin County, Illinois, Kuykendall completed preparatory studies and later studied law. He was admitted to the bar in 1840 and commenced practice in Vienna, Illinois. He served as member of the Illinois House of Representatives from 1842 to 1862.

During the Civil War, Kuykendall served one year in the Union Army as the major of the 31st Illinois Infantry.

Kuykendall was elected as a Republican to the Thirty-ninth Congress (March 4, 1865 – March 3, 1867). He resumed the practice of law in Vienna, Illinois. He later served as the county and probate judge of Johnson County, Illinois from 1873 to 1881. He served as member of the Illinois State Senate from 1878 to 1882. He retired from public life and engaged in agricultural pursuits.

A. J. Kuykendall died in Vienna, Illinois, May 11, 1891, and was interred in the Fraternal Cemetery.

References
 Retrieved on 2008-09-28

1815 births
1891 deaths
Union Army officers
Illinois lawyers
Republican Party Illinois state senators
Illinois state court judges
Republican Party members of the Illinois House of Representatives
People from Vienna, Illinois
People from Gallatin County, Illinois
People of Illinois in the American Civil War
Republican Party members of the United States House of Representatives from Illinois
19th-century American politicians
19th-century American judges
19th-century American lawyers